Quail Rise is a residential suburb of Queenstown in the South Island of New Zealand.

Development of the circa 200 residential sections started around 1996 with the final sections being released in 2012. More than 50 percent of the suburb is open space with landscaping being encouraged.

Demographics

Quail Rise had a population of 708 at the 2018 New Zealand census, an increase of 165 people (30.4%) since the 2013 census, and an increase of 357 people (101.7%) since the 2006 census. There were 234 households. There were 372 males and 339 females, giving a sex ratio of 1.1 males per female. The median age was 40.5 years (compared with 37.4 years nationally), with 153 people (21.6%) aged under 15 years, 99 (14.0%) aged 15 to 29, 354 (50.0%) aged 30 to 64, and 105 (14.8%) aged 65 or older.

Ethnicities were 88.1% European/Pākehā, 4.2% Māori, 1.3% Pacific peoples, 9.3% Asian, and 4.2% other ethnicities (totals add to more than 100% since people could identify with multiple ethnicities).

The proportion of people born overseas was 32.6%, compared with 27.1% nationally.

Although some people objected to giving their religion, 60.2% had no religion, 32.2% were Christian, 0.4% were Muslim, 0.8% were Buddhist and 2.5% had other religions.

Of those at least 15 years old, 180 (32.4%) people had a bachelor or higher degree, and 33 (5.9%) people had no formal qualifications. The median income was $49,200, compared with $31,800 nationally. 171 people (30.8%) earned over $70,000 compared to 17.2% nationally. The employment status of those at least 15 was that 318 (57.3%) people were employed full-time, and 114 (20.5%) were part-time.

References 

Suburbs of Queenstown, New Zealand
Populated places in Otago